Abdelkader Benfréha (28 October 1942 – 1 October 2012), known more commonly as Abdelkader Fréha, was an Algerian footballer who played nine times for the Algerian national team. He was nicknamed Béka or Head of gold.

Honours

Personnel
 Best goalscorer of MC Oran in all times with 148 goals.
 Best goalscorer in Algerian Championnat National in 1968, 1969 and 1971 with MC Oran.

Club
 Algerian Championnat National
 Winner in 1971 with MC Oran
 Runners-up in 1968, 1969 with MC Oran
 Algerian Cup
 Winner in 1975 with MC Oran

References

External links
  Abdelkader Freha statistics - dzfootball
  Abdelkader Freha biography - hamri.net

1942 births
2012 deaths
Algerian footballers
Algeria international footballers
Association football forwards
MC Oran players
USM Oran players
Footballers from Oran
21st-century Algerian people